Florence is an unincorporated community in California.  It is often considered part of South Los Angeles despite being outside the Los Angeles city limits.  It is serviced by area code 323 and has a ZIP Code of 90001. It is the northern part of the Florence-Graham CDP.

Emergency services
The Los Angeles County Sheriff's Department (LASD) operates the Century Station in Lynwood, serving Florence.

Education
Florence-Graham residents are zoned to Los Angeles Unified School District schools.

Residents are zoned to:
 Florence Avenue Elementary School
 Parmelee Elementary School
 Edison Middle School
 John C. Fremont High School

Famous people from Florence
 A. S. Nahas, founder of Nahas department store chain, lived here during adolescence.

References

County of Los Angeles Public Library operates the Florence Library.

Unincorporated communities in Los Angeles County, California
Unincorporated communities in California